Thangavelu Nagarathinam (born 1 September 1933 in Nungambakkam, Thiruvallur District (Previously Chengalpattu  District) in Tamil Nadu) is an Indian Tamil politician. T. Nagarathinam did his BA., from New Presidency College in Madras University and BL., in Dr. Ambedkar Law College Chennai. He was a member of Lok Sabha of India and has been elected two times from Sriperumbudur Constituency. He is an important leader of the DMK party and is known for political loyalty having been in the party.

References

India MPs 1996–1997
1933 births
India MPs 1980–1984
Dravida Munnetra Kazhagam politicians
Living people
Lok Sabha members from Tamil Nadu
People from Tiruvallur district
Presidency College, Chennai alumni
People from Kanchipuram district